Zero to 99 is the third album by the Boston Spaceships, released in 2009.

Track listing
All songs written by Robert Pollard.

Side A
Pluto The Skate - 1.17
How Wrong You Are - 2.27
Radical Amazement - 3.20
Found Obstruction Rock N' Rolls (We're The Ones Who Believe In Love) - 2.04
Question Girl All Right - 4.17
Let It Rest For A Little While - 2.23 (Featuring Peter Buck)
Trashed Aircraft Baby - 2.16
Psycho Is A Bad Boy - 1.38

Side B
Godless - 1.08
Meddle - 2.59
Go Inside - 2.44
Mr. Ghost Town - 1.52
Return To Your Ship - 1.36
Exploding Anthills - 2.11
The Comedian - 3.33
A Good Circuitry Soldier - 1.39

Personnel
Robert Pollard - vocals
John Moen - drums, percussion
Chris Slusarenko - guitar, bass, keyboards

References

2009 albums
Boston Spaceships albums